Marius Cheregi (born 4 October 1967) is a Romanian former professional footballer who played as a midfielder for clubs such as: UTA Arad, Bihor Oradea, Dinamo București, Brașov, Cercle Brugge, Samsunspor, Videoton or Ferencváros, among others.

Honours
Dinamo București
Liga I: 1991–92
Samsunspor
Balkans Cup: 1993–94
Ferencváros
Nemzeti Bajnokság I: 2000–01
Magyar Kupa: 2002–03

References

External links
 
 

1967 births
Living people
Sportspeople from Oradea
Romanian footballers
Association football midfielders
Liga II players
FC UTA Arad players
Liga I players
FC Bihor Oradea players
FC Dinamo București players
FC Brașov (1936) players
Belgian Pro League players
Cercle Brugge K.S.V. players
Süper Lig players
Samsunspor footballers
Liga Leumit players
Hapoel Tayibe F.C. players
Hapoel Be'er Sheva F.C. players
Nemzeti Bajnokság I players
Fehérvár FC players
Ferencvárosi TC footballers
Romanian expatriate footballers
Romanian expatriate sportspeople in Belgium
Expatriate footballers in Belgium
Romanian expatriate sportspeople in Israel
Expatriate footballers in Israel
Romanian expatriate sportspeople in Turkey
Expatriate footballers in Turkey
Romanian expatriate sportspeople in Hungary
Expatriate footballers in Hungary
Romania international footballers